During the 2006–07 English football season, West Ham United competed in the FA Premier League. They finished the season in 15th place.

Season summary
West Ham started the 2006–07 campaign brightly, but slipped down the table due to off-field distractions. They were knocked out from UEFA Cup by the Italian Serie A side Palermo (4–0 on aggregate) and saw themselves dragged into the relegation zone.

Eventually an Icelandic consortium led by Eggert Magnússon bought the club on 26 November 2006. Following a poor run of form that left the club in 17th position, despite the signing of big name players Javier Mascherano and Carlos Tevez, the new owners sacked Alan Pardew, replacing him with former West Ham player Alan Curbishley who had recently ended a 15-year spell in charge of Charlton Athletic. West Ham won Curbishley's first game 1–0 at home against Manchester United, but went on to draw at fellow relegation strugglers Fulham, were crushed 6–0 at newly promoted Reading and were knocked out of the FA Cup by the bottom Premiership team, Watford. An end-to-end thriller at home to Tottenham Hotspur ended with West Ham losing 4–3 having been 3–2 in front with minutes to play, but the bright performance signified a change in form.

At the same time the signings of Mascherano and Tevez were being investigated by the Premier League, who were concerned that details regarding the transfers had been omitted from official records and whether the influence of MSI, led by Kia Joorabchian, breached Premier League rules regarding third party ownership of players. The media touted the idea that Tevez's contract could be terminated, possibly resulting in a deduction of points for playing an ineligible player. On 27 April 2007, West Ham pleaded guilty and were handed a record £5.5 million fine by the Premier League, but avoided a points deduction. Liverpool's signing of Mascherano was investigated and he was cleared to play after a two-week delay.

Following the verdict, Wigan Athletic's chairman Dave Whelan threatened legal action, supported by other relegation-threatened sides including Fulham and Sheffield United, saying "This is a very serious offence West Ham committed...They broke the law, told blatant lies and should have got a 10-point penalty. If we can sue West Ham or the Premier League, I am sure that will happen." Wigan's manager Paul Jewell suggested League officials had intimated they wished to see them relegated.

In a period that came to be known by the club's fans as "The Great Escape", West Ham avoided relegation by winning seven of their last nine games, including a 1–0 win over Arsenal, and on the last day of the season, defeating the Premiership champions Manchester United 1–0 to finish outside the relegation zone in 15th. Sheffield United, who were relegated, later sued West Ham for up to £30m, and an FA arbitration panel found in their favour. The two clubs settled out of court for an undisclosed sum in 2009.

Final league table

Squad

Left club during season

Results

Premier League

League Cup

FA Cup

UEFA Cup

Statistics

Overview

Goalscorers

League position by matchday

Appearances and goals

|-
! colspan=14 style=background:#dcdcdc; text-align:center| Goalkeepers

|-
! colspan=14 style=background:#dcdcdc; text-align:center| Defenders

|-
! colspan=14 style=background:#dcdcdc; text-align:center| Midfielders

|-
! colspan=14 style=background:#dcdcdc; text-align:center| Forwards

|}

Transfers

In

Out

References

West Ham United F.C. seasons
West Ham United
West Ham United
West Ham United